The men's sanda 56 kg at the 1998 Asian Games in Bangkok, Thailand was held from 16 to 19 December at the Thammasat Gymnasium 6.

Sanda, formerly knows as Sanshou is the official Chinese full contact combat sport. Sanda (Sanshou) is a fighting system which was originally developed by the Chinese military based upon the study and practices of traditional Kung fu and modern combat fighting techniques.

A total of 10 men from 10 different countries competed in this event, limited to fighters whose body weight was less than 56 kilograms.

Zheng Kunyou from China won the gold medal after beating Pichit Jaisaka of the host nation Thailand in gold medal bout 2–0, The bronze medal was shared by Roger Chulhang from the Philippines and Yeh Chun-chang of Chinese Taipei.

Schedule
All times are Indochina Time (UTC+07:00)

Results

References

External links
Official website

Men's sanda 56 kg